This is a list of party secretaries of the Socialist Left Party which spans a history of over 35 years.

List of party secretaries
Party leaders are indicated with a blue background.

References
General
The list of party secretaries were taken from this webpage:

Specific

External links
 Official website

Socialist Left Party (Norway)